Chris Hani Baragwanath Hospital is a hospital in Johannesburg, South Africa, it is the largest hospital in Africa and third largest hospital in the world. It has 6,760 staff members, 3,400 beds and occupies . The hospital is located in the Soweto area south of Johannesburg. It is one of the 40 Gauteng provincial hospitals, and is financed and managed by the Gauteng Provincial Department of Health. It is a teaching hospital for the University of the Witwatersrand Medical School, along with the Charlotte Maxeke Johannesburg Academic Hospital, Helen Joseph Hospital and the Rahima Moosa Mother and Child Hospital. It is an accredited Level one trauma center currently led by Trauma Surgery Consultant, Dr Riaan Pretorius. The hospital has world class trauma and emergency medicine facilities capable of all medical treatment.

History

The Imperial Military Hospital, Baragwanath, was built in what today is Diepkloof in 1942 for convalescing British and Commonwealth soldiers. Field Marshal Jan Smuts noted during the opening ceremonies that the facility would be used for the area's black population after the war. In 1947 King George VI visited and presented medals to the troops there. From this start grew Baragwanath Hospital (as it became known after 1948), reputedly the largest hospital in the southern hemisphere. In 1997 another name change followed, with the sprawling facility now known as Chris Hani Baragwanath Hospital in honour of the South African Communist Party leader who was assassinated in 1993.

Admissions and operations
More than two thousand patients check into the hospital's specialised clinics and out-patient departments daily, from catchment areas as far as Klerksdorp. In 2022 the hospital was over R66 million in arrears with its bills for municipal services.

References

External links
 University of Witwatersrand.
 Just Another Day at the World's Biggest Hospital on NPR's All Things Considered, 1 December 2003. Includes an audio report and a flash presentation.
 Baragwanath History in South Africa: The Baragwanath family history in South Africa.
 24 hours of trauma TV documentary on the trauma unit by Aljazeera English. 9 January 2009.

Hospital buildings completed in 1941
1941 establishments in South Africa
Teaching hospitals in South Africa
Buildings and structures in Soweto
Hospitals established in 1941
University of the Witwatersrand
Hospitals in Johannesburg
20th-century architecture in South Africa